Ralf Emil Olin (April 12, 1925 – May 25, 2007) was an American-born speed skater who represented Canada at the Olympics. Olin competed in four Olympic Games - 1952, 1956, 1960 and 1964. His best result was a 15th-place finish in the 10,000 meters in 1964. He was the Canadian flag bearer in the 1964 Winter Olympics. He was born in Seattle, Washington.

In December 1962, he conducted the Canadian national team during a six-week training project in Sweden.

References

External links
 

1925 births
2007 deaths
Canadian male speed skaters
Olympic speed skaters of Canada
Speed skaters at the 1952 Winter Olympics
Speed skaters at the 1956 Winter Olympics
Speed skaters at the 1960 Winter Olympics
Speed skaters at the 1964 Winter Olympics
Sportspeople from Seattle
20th-century Canadian people